Zaw Oo is a three-time Myanmar National Chess Championship winner (2002, 2009, and 2011).

References

Living people
1974 births
Burmese chess players